The American Nazi Party (ANP) is an American far-right and neo-Nazi political party founded by George Lincoln Rockwell and headquartered in Arlington, Virginia. The organization was originally named the World Union of Free Enterprise National Socialists (WUFENS), a name to denote opposition to state ownership of property, the same year—it was renamed the American Nazi Party in order to attract 'maximum media attention'. Since the late 1960s, a number of small groups have used the name "American Nazi Party" with most being independent of each other and disbanding before the 21st century. The party is based largely upon the ideals and policies of Adolf Hitler's Nazi Party in Germany during the Nazi era, and embraced its uniforms and iconography.

Shortly after Rockwell's murder in 1967, the organization appointed Rockwell's second in command, Deputy Commander Matt Koehl as the new leader. The American Nazi Party, now under Koehl's command, was subject to ideological disagreements between members in the 1970s and 1980s. "In 1982, Martin Kerr, a leader at the Franklin Road headquarters, announced that the organization was changing its name to the New Order and moving to the Midwest," effective January 1, 1983. Due to recruitment issues along with financial and legal trouble, Koehl was forced to relocate the group's headquarters from the DC area, eventually finding his way to scattered locations in Wisconsin and Michigan. After Koehl's death in 2014, a long-time member and officer of the New Order, Martin Kerr assumed leadership and maintains the New Order website and organization.

A former member of the original American Nazi Party, Rocky Suhayda, founded his own organization using the American Nazi Party name and has been active since at least 2008. Suhayda claims Rockwell as its founder despite no direct legal or financial link between it and Rockwell's legacy organization. The one connection between the original American Nazi Party and Rocky Suhayda's group besides ideology is that they sell reprints of Rockwell's 1960s-era magazine The Stormtrooper on their website.

Headquarters 
The WUFENS headquarters was located in a residence on Williamsburg Boulevard in Arlington, but was moved as the ANP headquarters to a house at 928 North Randolph Street (now a hotel and office building site). Rockwell and some party members also established a "Stormtrooper Barracks" in an old mansion owned by the widow of Willis Kern in the Dominion Hills section of Arlington at what is now the Upton Hill Regional Park. After Rockwell's murder, the headquarters was moved again to one side of a duplex brick and concrete storefront at 2507 North Franklin Road which featured a swastika prominently mounted above the front door. This site was visible from busy Wilson Boulevard. Today, the Franklin Road address is often misidentified as Rockwell's headquarters when in fact it was the successor organization's last physical address in Arlington (now a coffeehouse).

History

Name change and party reform 
Under Rockwell, the party embraced Nazi uniforms and iconography.

After several years of living in impoverished conditions, Rockwell began to experience some financial success with paid speaking engagements at universities where he was invited to express his controversial views as exercises in free speech. This prompted him to end the rancorous "Phase One" party tactics and begin "Phase Two", a plan to recast the group as a legitimate political party by toning down the verbal and written attacks against non-whites, replacing the party rallying cry of "Sieg Heil!" with "White Power!", limiting public display of the swastika, and entering candidates in local elections.

The years 1965 and 1967 were possibly the height of Rockwell's profile. He was interviewed by Playboy magazine, an event that stirred controversy within the ranks. At the time Rockwell had about 500 followers. In 1966 or 1967, Rockwell renamed the ANP the National Socialist White People's Party (NSWPP), a move that alienated some hard-line members. The new name was a "conscious imitation" of the National Association for the Advancement of Colored People. Rockwell wanted a more "ecumenical" approach and felt that the swastika banner was impeding organizational growth. Rockwell was killed on August 25, 1967, before he could implement party reforms. Matt Koehl, a purist Neo-Nazi, succeeded Rockwell as the new leader and this ended the American Nazi Party. Thereafter, the members engaged in internecine disputes, and they were either expelled by Koehl or they resigned. After the murder of Rockwell, the party dissipated and ad hoc organizations usurped the American Nazi Party logo. Those included James Burford in Chicago and John Bishop in Iowa.

Murder of Rockwell 
An assassination attempt was made on Rockwell on June 28, 1967. As Rockwell returned from shopping, he drove into the long driveway of the "Stormtrooper Barracks" located in Arlington's Dominion Hills subdivision and found it blocked by a felled tree and brush. Rockwell assumed that it was another prank by local teens. As a party member cleared the obstruction, two shots were fired at Rockwell from behind one of the swastika-embossed brick driveway pillars. One of the shots ricocheted off the car, right next to his head. Leaping from the car, Rockwell pursued the gunman. On June 30, Rockwell petitioned the Arlington County Circuit Court for a gun permit; no action was ever taken on his request.

On August 25, 1967, as Rockwell left the Econowash laundromat at the Dominion Hills Shopping Center, a former follower named John Patler shot Rockwell from the roof of the building. Patler fired two bullets into Rockwell's car through the windshield.  One missed, the other hit his chest and ruptured his heart.  His car rolled backward to a stop and Rockwell staggered out of the front passenger side door of the car, stood briefly while pointing upward at the strip mall's rooftop where the shots had come from and then collapsed on the pavement. He was pronounced dead at the scene.

Koehl's succession and ideological divisions 
Rockwell's second in command, Deputy Commander Matt Koehl, a staunch Hitlerist, assumed the leadership role after a council agreed that he should retain command. Koehl continued some of Rockwell's restructuring of the group by dropping the use of negative verbal and written attacks against racial minorities. Koehl also began emphasizing the positive aspects of Nazism and the glories of a future all-white society. Koehl retained the swastika-festooned party literature and the pseudo-Nazi uniforms of the party's "Storm Troopers" which were modeled on those worn by the Nazi Party's Sturmabteilung. In 1968, Koehl moved the party to a new headquarters on 2507 North Franklin Road, clearly visible from Arlington's main thoroughfare, Wilson Boulevard. He also established a printing press, a "George Lincoln Rockwell Memorial Book Store", and member living quarters on property nearby.

The party began to experience ideological divisions among its followers as it entered the 1970s. In 1970, member Frank Collin, who was himself secretly the son of a Jewish father, broke away from the group and founded the National Socialist Party of America in Chicago, which became famous for its attempt to march through Skokie, Illinois, which was home to many Holocaust survivors. This led to the United States Supreme Court case, National Socialist Party of America v. Village of Skokie. Other dissatisfied members of the NSWPP chose to support William Luther Pierce, and formed the National Alliance in 1974.

Further membership erosion occurred as Koehl, drawing heavily upon the teachings of Hitlerian mystic Savitri Devi, began to suggest that Nazism was more akin to a religious movement than a political one. He espoused the belief that Adolf Hitler was the gift of an inscrutable divine providence who had been sent to rescue the white race from decadence and gradual extinction which had been caused by a declining birth rate and miscegenation. Hitler's death in 1945 was viewed as a type of martyrdom; a voluntary, Christ-like self-sacrifice, that looked forward to a spiritual resurrection of Nazism at a later date when the Aryan race would need it the most. These esoteric beliefs led to disputes with the World Union of National Socialists, which Rockwell had founded and whose leader, Danish neo-Nazi Povl Riis-Knudsen, had been appointed by Koehl. Undaunted, Koehl continued to recast the party as a new religion in formation. Public rallies were gradually phased out in favor of low-key gatherings which were held in private venues. On Labor Day 1979, in a highly unpopular move for some members, Koehl disbanded the party's paramilitary "Storm Troopers."

On November 3, 1979, some members of the NSWPP and a Ku Klux Klan group attacked a Communist Workers' Party protest march in Greensboro, North Carolina. The group of neo-Nazis and Klansmen shot and killed five marchers. Forty Klansmen and neo-Nazis were involved in the shootings with sixteen Klansmen and neo-Nazis being arrested. The six strongest cases were brought to trial first, but the two criminal trials resulted in the acquittal of the defendants by all-white juries. However, in a 1985 civil lawsuit, the survivors won a $350,000 judgment against the city, the Klansmen, and the neo-Nazis after they were all found guilty of violating the civil rights of the demonstrators. The shootings became known as the "Greensboro Massacre."

In 1982 the Internal Revenue Service took action to foreclose on the group's headquarters in Arlington, Virginia. Koehl ceased printing the organization's White Power newspaper, sold its Arlington, Virginia, real estate holdings, and dispersed the group's various operations to scattered locations in Wisconsin and Michigan. A secluded  rural property called "Nordland" was purchased in New Berlin, Wisconsin, to serve as living quarters and to host annual meetings and ceremonial events.

New Order
The Koehl organization changed its name to New Order on January 1, 1983 on the grounds that the people in the area "are not people looking to join revolutionary organizations", saying that it was moving to an area in the Midwest which it would not reveal for security reasons. The name change reflected the group's Nazi mysticism and it was still known by that name in 2010.

The organization briefly attracted the media's attention in October 1983, when it held a private meeting at Yorktown High School in Arlington, Virginia. A non-uniformed gathering of members was held indoors while the police kept a crowd of counter-protesters at bay outside. This event marked the last publicized appearance of Koehl and the New Order in Arlington. From that point forward the only outward sign that the group was still operational was the annual appearance of the swastika and Betsy Ross American Revolutionary War flags flying from the party's nondescript headquarters building on North Franklin Road every April 20 (Hitler's birthday).

Today the New Order operates quietly far from the public spotlight, eschewing the confrontational public rallies that were once a hallmark of its previous incarnations. It maintains a web page and a Milwaukee, Wisconsin, post office box providing information and template material promoting Nazism. It has no members but rather "registered supporters" who pledge to mail in donations on a monthly basis. Financing is also obtained through sales of books and other merchandise under an affiliate business, NS Publications of Wyandotte, Michigan. The NS Bulletin, a newsletter, is sent to supporters on a quarterly basis. The group holds occasional ceremonial gatherings at undisclosed private locations such as an annual observance of Hitler's birthday each April 20.

New Order's Chief of Staff, Martin Kerr, claims that the group is no longer a white supremacist group and focuses on advocating "in favor of [white] people, not against other races or ethnicities...we consider the white people of the world to be a gigantic family of racial brothers and sisters, united by ties of common ancestry and common heritage. Being for our own family does not mean that we hate other families."  The SPLC still classifies them as neo-Nazis and as a "hate group."

In May 2021 two versions of leaflets promoting the white race were scattered in plastic bags containing business cards in a number of Greene County, Virginia neighborhoods.

Namesake organizations 
Since the late 1960s, there have been a number of small groups that have used the name "American Nazi Party."
 Perhaps the first was led by James Warner and Allen Vincent and it consisted of members of the California branch of the NSWPP. This group announced its existence on January 1, 1968. In 1982 James Burford formed another "American Nazi Party" from disaffected branches of the National Socialist Party of America. This Chicago-based group remained in existence until at least 1994.
A small American Nazi Party operated from Davenport, Iowa, led by John Robert Bishop until 1985.
The name "American Nazi Party" has also been adopted by a group run by Rocky J. Suhayda, a member of Rockwell's original ANP in 1967. Although Suhayda's ANP states that Rockwell was its founder, there is no direct legal or financial link between it and Rockwell's legacy organization now called the New Order.  Headquartered in Westland, Michigan, Suhayda's ANP website sells nostalgic reprints of Rockwell's 1960s-era magazine The Stormtrooper. 2008 Neo-Nazi presidential candidate John Taylor Bowles was a member. Suhayda holds semi-private yearly meetings at his home and a national convention in California. His followers do not wear uniforms, except for the SA, or Security Arm, and they eschew public demonstrations, frequently criticizing the rival organization the National Socialist Movement for "outing" its members with excessive media exposure.

Notable former members 
David Duke was a member before he went on to establish the Knights of the Ku Klux Klan organization
Frank Collin, founder of the National Socialist Party of America
James Mason, former convict, author, associate of Charles Manson
Joseph Tommasi, founder of the National Socialist Liberation Front
Kurt Saxon (author of The Poor Man's James Bond)
William Luther Pierce (founder of the National Alliance)
Arthur J. Jones, Republican candidate for Illinois's 3rd congressional district in the November 2018 midterm elections

See also 
 German American Bund
 Nazism in the Americas
 Neo-Nazi groups of the United States

References
Informational notes

Citations

Bibliography

Further reading

Goodrick-Clarke, Nicholas (1998) Hitler's Priestess: Savitri Devi, the Hindu-Aryan Myth, and Neo-Nazism. New York: New York University Press.
Goodrick-Clarke, Nicholas (2001) Black Sun: Aryan Cults, Esoteric Nazism and the Politics of Identity. New York: New York University Press. 

Simonelli, Frederick J. (1999) American Fuehrer: George Lincoln Rockwell and the American Nazi Party. Urbana: University of Illinois Press.  and

External links
Federal Bureau of Investigation - American Nazi Party monograph, June 1965 – Detailed report on George Lincoln Rockwell and the original American Nazi Party

1959 establishments in the United States
1959 establishments in Virginia
Anti-communist organizations in the United States
Anti-Zionism in the United States
Anti-Zionist political parties
Antisemitism in the United States
COINTELPRO targets
Violence against LGBT people in the United States
Neo-Nazi political parties in the United States
Organizations based in Alexandria, Virginia
Organizations that oppose LGBT rights in the United States
Political parties established in 1959
Terrorism in the United States